The 2006 Thunder Bay municipal election was held on 13 November 2006 in Thunder Bay, Ontario to elect a mayor, 12 city councillors, trustees for the Lakehead District School Board, the Thunder Bay Catholic District School Board, the Conseil scolaire de district du Grand Nord de l'Ontario, and the Conseil scolaire de district catholique des Aurores boréales. This election coincided with the 2006 Ontario municipal elections being held across Ontario.

Thunder Bay City Council 

Voters are asked to elect a mayor, five at-large city councillors and seven ward councillors. Of 86,914 registered voters, 33,196 votes were cast and 33,192 votes were counted. Voter turnout was the lowest in the city's history at 38.2%.

Mayor 

Three candidates ran for the office of Mayor. The incumbent, Lynn Peterson, was re-elected by a considerable margin.

Councillors at-large 

Five councillors are elected at-large to sit on City Council. Fifteen people ran for the position in 2006. Each registered voter can choose up to five candidates.

Ward councillors 

The city of Thunder Bay is divided into seven electoral wards: Current River, McIntyre, McKellar, Neebing, Northwood, Red River, and Westfort. Residents of each ward elect one member to represent their ward on city council. Twenty people ran for these positions in five wards. The incumbent councillors in Northwood and Neebing wards were acclaimed.

Current River

McIntyre

McKellar 

On 18 October 2007 Andy Savela announced his resignation 
to take on further responsibilities with the Canadian Auto Workers. City council voted 6–5 on 5 November 2007 to appoint Robert Tuchenhagen, to the position. Tuchenhagen was defeated by Savela by 377 votes. He was sworn in on 19 November 2007.

Neebing 

The incumbent, Linda Rydholm, was acclaimed.

Northwood 

The incumbent, Mark Bentz, was acclaimed.

Red River

Westfort

District School Boards 

Three boards of education to which voters elect trustees operate in the city of Thunder Bay. The Lakehead District School Board is an English language public school board and elects 8 trustees at-large in the Thunder Bay Census Metropolitan Area, the Thunder Bay Catholic District School Board is an English language separate school board and elects 6 trustees at-large in the Thunder Bay Census Metropolitan Area, the Conseil scolaire de district du Grand Nord de l'Ontario is a French language public school board and elects one trustee from Northwestern Ontario, and the Conseil scolaire de district catholique des Aurores boréales is a French language separate school board and elects 4 trustees at-large in Northwestern Ontario.

Lakehead District School Board 

Eight trustees are elected to the Lakehead District School Board by registered voters in the city of Thunder Bay, the six municipalities in its CMA, and voters in the unorganized portion of Thunder Bay District. Each registered voter can choose up to eight candidates. Thirteen people ran for this position.

Thunder Bay Catholic District School Board 

Six trustees are elected to the Thunder Bay Catholic District School Board by registered Roman Catholic voters in the city of Thunder Bay, the six municipalities in its CMA, and voters in the unorganized portion of Thunder Bay District. Each registered voter can choose up to six candidates.  Fourteen people ran for this position.

Conseil scolaire de district du Grand Nord de l'Ontario 

One trustee is elected to the Conseil scolaire de district du Grand Nord de l'Ontario by registered voters with French language education rights in Northwestern Ontario.

Conseil scolaire de district catholique des Aurores boréales 

Four trustees are elected to the Conseil scolaire de district catholique des Aurores boréales by registered Roman Catholic voters with French language education rights in Northwestern Ontario. All four candidates, Anne Breton, Angele M. M. Brunelle, Bernard Caron and Claudette Gleeson, were acclaimed.

See also 

 Thunder Bay City Council
 2006 Ontario municipal elections

References 

2006 Ontario municipal elections
Municipal government of Thunder Bay